The 2001 Hawaii Warriors football team represented the University of Hawaii at Manoa in the 2001 NCAA Division I-A football season. Hawaii finished the 2001 season with a 9–3 record, going 5–3 in Western Athletic Conference (WAC) play.

Schedule

References

Hawaii
Hawaii Rainbow Warriors football seasons
Hawaii Warriors football